Pseudocharis melanthus is a moth in the subfamily Arctiinae. It was described by Stoll in 1781. It is found in Colombia and Suriname.

References

Moths described in 1781
Euchromiina